Bertrand's box paradox is a veridical paradox in elementary probability theory. It was first posed by Joseph Bertrand in his 1889 work Calcul des Probabilités.

There are three boxes: 
 a box containing two gold coins,
 a box containing two silver coins,
 a box containing one gold coin and one silver coin.

The question is to calculate the probability, after choosing a box at random and withdrawing one coin at random, if that happens to be a gold coin, of the next coin drawn from the same box also being a gold coin.

A veridical paradox is when the correct solution to a puzzle appears to be counterintuitive. It may seem intuitive that the probability that the remaining coin is gold should be , but the probability is actually . However, this is not the paradox Bertrand referred to. He showed that if  were correct, it would lead to a contradiction, so  cannot be correct.

This simple but counterintuitive puzzle is used as a standard example in teaching probability theory. The solution illustrates some basic principles, including the Kolmogorov axioms.

Solution

The problem can be reframed by describing the boxes as each having one drawer on each of two sides. Each drawer contains a coin. One box has a gold coin on each side (GG), one a silver coin on each side (SS), and the other a gold coin on one side and a silver coin on the other (GS). A box is chosen at random, a random drawer is opened, and a gold coin is found inside it. What is the chance of the coin on the other side being gold?

The following faulty reasoning appears to give a probability of :
Originally, all three boxes were equally likely to be chosen.
The chosen box cannot be box SS.
So it must be box GG or GS.
The two remaining possibilities are equally likely.

The flaw is in the last step. While those two cases were originally equally likely, the fact that you are certain to find a gold coin if you had chosen the GG box, but are only 50% sure of finding a gold coin if you had chosen the GS box, means they are no longer equally likely given that you have found a gold coin. Specifically:

The probability that GG would produce a gold coin is 1.
The probability that SS would produce a gold coin is 0.

Initially GG, SS and GS are equally likely . Therefore, by Bayes rule the conditional probability that the chosen box is GG, given we have observed a gold coin, is:

The correct answer of  can also be obtained as follows:
Originally, all six coins were equally likely to be chosen.
The chosen coin cannot be from drawer S of box GS, or from either drawer of box SS.
So it must come from the G drawer of box GS, or either drawer of box GG.

Alternatively, one can simply note that the chosen box has two coins of the same type  of the time. So, regardless of what kind of coin is in the chosen drawer, the box has two coins of that type  of the time. In other words, the problem is equivalent to asking the question "What is the probability that I will pick a box with two coins of the same color?".

Bertrand's point in constructing this example was to show that merely counting cases is not always proper. Instead, one should sum the probabilities that the cases would produce the observed result; and the two methods are equivalent only if this probability is either 1 or 0 in every case. This condition is correctly applied in the second solution method, but not in the first.

The paradox as stated by Bertrand
It can be easier to understand why  is incorrect, if you consider the paradox Bertrand used. After a box has been chosen, but before a drawer is opened, there is a  probability that the box has two of the same kind of coin. Opening the drawer that you selected cannot change that.

Experimental data

In a survey of 53 Psychology freshmen taking an introductory probability course, 35 incorrectly responded ; only 3 students correctly responded .

Related problems
Other veridical paradoxes in probability include:
 Boy or Girl paradox
 Monty Hall problem
 Three Prisoners problem
 Two envelopes problem
 Sleeping Beauty problem

The Monty Hall and Three Prisoners problems are mathematically identical to Bertrand's Box paradox. The construction of the Boy or Girl paradox is similar, essentially adding a fourth box with a gold coin and a silver coin. Its answer is controversial, based on how one assumes the "drawer" was chosen.

References

Nickerson, Raymond (2004). Cognition and Chance: The psychology of probabilistic reasoning, Lawrence Erlbaum. Ch. 5, "Some instructive problems: Three cards", pp. 157–160. 
Michael Clark, Paradoxes from A to Z, p. 16;
Howard Margolis, Wason, Monty Hall, and Adverse Defaults.

External links
Estimating the Probability with Random Boxes and Names, a simulation

Probability theory paradoxes
Probability problems